TV 2 Bliss was a Norwegian television channel designed for a mostly female audience. In November 2015, the channel was replaced by TV 2 Livsstil.

Programs
List of programs broadcast by TV 2 Bliss

References

Defunct television channels in Norway
Television channels and stations established in 2010
Television channels and stations disestablished in 2015
2010 establishments in Norway
2015 disestablishments in Norway
TV 2 (Norway)